A leadership spill in the Australian Labor Party, the party then forming the Government of Australia, took place on 26 June 2013 at 7:00pm AEST. Prime Minister Julia Gillard called a ballot for Leader and Deputy Leader of the Labor Party live on Sky News Australia at 4:00pm, following persistent leadership tensions. She stated that she would retire from politics if she lost the vote, while calling on any would-be challengers to pledge to do the same if they lost. In a press conference held shortly after Gillard's announcement, backbencher and former Prime Minister Kevin Rudd announced that he would challenge Gillard, whilst also pledging to step down if he did not win the vote. At the ALP caucus meeting, Rudd was elected Leader of the Labor Party, with the caucus voting 57–45 in his favour.

Following new leadership election reforms which introduced 50:50 weightage for the party membership and caucus in leadership votes subsequently implemented by Rudd, this marked the last time that the Leader of the Federal Parliamentary Labor Party was elected solely by the caucus.

Background
Despite the previous leadership spill on 21 March 2013, at which Gillard was re-elected leader unopposed, tensions continued to remain high. By 10 June 2013, the security of Gillard's position as leader was plunged into doubt following the loss of significant support in the Labor caucus, as well as persistently bad opinion polling that indicated Labor could be left with the low number of 40 seats in the House of Representatives. ABC News reported that "some former staunch supporters" now held the view that Gillard could not win the upcoming election, and ABC journalist Barrie Cassidy identified former Prime Minister Kevin Rudd as the only feasible replacement.

The political editor of The Australian newspaper, Dennis Shanahan, reported on 10 June that Rudd had been "mobbed" by members of the public in Geelong on 7 June 2013, and that he was "expected to be returned to the ALP leadership". On 26 June, rumours began to spread that supporters of Rudd were circulating a caucus petition calling for a vote to challenge Gillard for the leadership. In an interview with Sky News Australia that afternoon, Gillard told interviewer David Speers that she had not seen the rumoured petition, and jokingly called it the "political equivalent of the Loch Ness Monster".  She also said that nobody had approached her to advise they intended to challenge her. Gillard then proceeded to call a leadership election for 7:00pm that evening to end the speculation, declaring that she would retire from politics if she lost, and called on any potential challenger to make the same commitment.

Rudd announced in a press conference shortly afterwards that he would challenge Gillard for the leadership, and committed to retiring from politics if he lost. Shortly before the 7:00pm vote, influential factional leader Bill Shorten, who had first come out in support of Gillard in the 2010 and 2012 leadership spills, announced that he would support Rudd as he believed he was the person most likely to defeat Tony Abbott in the upcoming general election.

Result
102 members of the Labor caucus from the House of Representatives and the Senate were eligible to vote, with 52 votes needed to win. All caucus members voted and Kevin Rudd won the ballot by 57 votes to 45, therefore becoming Leader of the Labor Party for the second time. Following the result, Deputy Leader Wayne Swan announced that he would resign his position. Anthony Albanese subsequently defeated Simon Crean by 61 votes to 38 votes, thus becoming the Deputy Leader of the Labor Party. Penny Wong was also unanimously elected to be Labor's leader in the Senate, with Jacinta Collins elected as her deputy.

Summary of changes

Aftermath
Julia Gillard publicly congratulated Kevin Rudd on his victory, and announced her resignation as Prime Minister of Australia. In keeping with the pledge she made before the vote, she also announced that she would not seek re-election at the upcoming general election. Wayne Swan, Craig Emerson, Peter Garrett, Stephen Conroy, Joe Ludwig and Greg Combet all also announced their resignations from the cabinet. Gillard submitted her resignation as Prime Minister to Governor-General Quentin Bryce that evening, to take effect the following day. Rudd was subsequently sworn in as Prime Minister for the second time, with Anthony Albanese being sworn in as Deputy Prime Minister.

On 4 August 2013, Rudd visited the Governor-General and asked her to dissolve parliament and issue writs for an election on 7 September.

At the 2013 federal election on 7 September, Rudd led Labor to defeat and resigned as Labor leader.

See also

2010 Australian Labor Party leadership spill
2012 Australian Labor Party leadership spill
March 2013 Australian Labor Party leadership spill
Second Rudd Ministry

References

2013 elections in Australia
Australian Labor Party leadership spills
Gillard Government
Rudd Government
June 2013 events in Australia
Australian Labor Party leadership spill